The 1921 Norwegian Football Cup was the 20th season of the Norwegian annual knockout football tournament. The tournament was open for all members of NFF. This was the third consecutive year that Frigg played in the final, but after having lost the previous two they won 2-0 against Odd in this year's final and won their third title. Ørn were the defending champions, but were eliminated by Brann in the quarterfinal.

Qualifying round

|-
|colspan="3" style="background-color:#97DEFF"|Replay

|}

First round

|-
|colspan="3" style="background-color:#97DEFF"|Replay

|}

Second round

|-
|colspan="3" style="background-color:#97DEFF"|Replay

|}

Third round

|}

Quarter-finals

|}

Semi-finals

|-
|colspan="3" style="background-color:#97DEFF"|Replay

|}

Final

See also
1921 in Norwegian football

References

Norwegian Football Cup seasons
Norway
Football Cup